Ikerasak may refer to the following locations in Greenland:

 Ikerasak, a settlement on Ikerasak Island in the Uummannaq Fjord region in northwestern Greenland
 Ikerasak Island, an island in the Uummannaq Fjord region in northwestern Greenland
 Ikerasak Fjord, a tributary fjord of Uummannaq Fjord in northwestern Greenland
 Ikerasak Strait, a strait in Upernavik Archipelago in northwestern Greenland